George "Big Bertha" Edwards was an American football player and coach. He served as the head football coach at Kentucky State College—now known as Kentucky State University from 1951 to 1956, compiling a record of 27–27–2.

Football career
Edwards played football at Englewood High School in Chicago, where he earned All-City, All-Chicagoland, and All-State honors. He played college football at Kentucky State College from 1934 to 1938, and the team won national championships in 1934 and 1937. He was selected for the 1938 All-Star team that lost to the professional Chicago Bears by a score of 51-0. He was selected for All-American honors in 1934 and 1938. He was captain of the 1938 Kentucky State and All-American teams. He also played on the school's basketball team from 1934 to 1937, and in 1999, he was selected as a member of that team's all-time second team.

He went on the play two years of semi-professional football, one with the Harlem Brown Bombers, and one with the Patterson Panthers. Edwards coached the DuSable High School football team for two seasons, including 1944. He coached basketball at Russellville High School in Kentucky, compiling a 64-11 record and winning a tri-state championship.

Edwards returned to Kentucky State in 1947 to be the school's boxing coach and the football backfield coach. He was also head baseball coach in 1950. He was named head football coach on December 1, 1950. Edwards was the 11th head football coach at Kentucky State, and he held that position for six seasons, from 1951 until 1956.  His career coaching record at Kentucky State was 27–27–2. He resigned his coaching position effective June 30, 1957.

He was an inaugural inductee to the Kentucky State Athletic Hall of Fame in 1975.

He was married and had three sons as of 1950.

References

Year of birth missing
Year of death missing
Kentucky State Thorobreds baseball coaches
Kentucky State Thorobreds football players
Kentucky State Thorobreds football coaches
College boxing coaches in the United States
High school basketball coaches in Kentucky
High school football coaches in Illinois
Sportspeople from Chicago
Coaches of American football from Illinois
African-American coaches of American football
African-American baseball coaches
African-American basketball coaches
20th-century African-American sportspeople